The 2018 Geneva Open (also known as the Banque Eric Sturdza Geneva Open for sponsorship reasons) was a men's tennis tournament played on outdoor clay courts. It was the 16th edition of the Geneva Open and part of the ATP World Tour 250 series of the 2018 ATP World Tour. It took place at the Tennis Club de Genève in Geneva, Switzerland, from May 20 through May 26, 2018.

Singles main draw entrants

Seeds 

 Rankings are as of May 14, 2018.

Other entrants 
The following players received wildcards into the singles main draw:
  David Ferrer 
  Fabio Fognini  
  Stan Wawrinka

The following players received entry from the qualifying draw:
  Dominik Köpfer
  Lukáš Rosol 
  Noah Rubin
  Bernabé Zapata Miralles

Withdrawals 
Before the tournament
  Alexandr Dolgopolov → replaced by  Marcos Baghdatis
  David Goffin → replaced by  Florian Mayer
  Philipp Kohlschreiber → replaced by  Mirza Bašić
  Paolo Lorenzi → replaced by  Marco Cecchinato
  Denis Shapovalov → replaced by  Ivo Karlović

Doubles main draw entrants

Seeds

 Rankings are as of May 14, 2018.

Other entrants
The following pairs received wildcards into the doubles main draw:
  Antoine Bellier /  Johan Nikles
  Marius Copil /  Constantin Sturdza

Champions

Singles

  Márton Fucsovics def.  Peter Gojowczyk, 6–2, 6-2

Doubles

  Oliver Marach /  Mate Pavić def.  Ivan Dodig /  Rajeev Ram, 3–6, 7–6(7–3), [11–9]

References

External links 
 Official website

 
2018 ATP World Tour
2018
2018 in Swiss tennis
May 2018 sports events in Switzerland